Mavic is a France-based bicycle parts manufacturer, its name an acronym for Manufacture d'Articles Vélocipédiques Idoux et Chanel.

It was founded by Charles Idoux and Lucien Chanel in Lyon, France in the late 1800s. Mavic produced the first aluminium rim in 1934, and the first disc wheel in 1973. Also in 1973 Mavic introduced "neutral" support for all racing teams during cycle races.

Mavic has developed many products over the years, including a Tour de France winning groupset, but is today focused on wheels.

In 2019 Mavic was sold by Amer Sports to the equity firm Regent, LP. After some ownership turmoil it was sold to Bourrelier Group in 2020.

References

External links

 Mavic official homepage
 Velo Retro:Mavic Timeline
 R-Sys Wheelset review, Bicycling Magazine, July 2007
 VeloNews article on Mavic Service Course

Cycle manufacturers of France
Cycle parts manufacturers
French brands
Companies based in Auvergne-Rhône-Alpes